Earth X is a 1999 comic book limited series published by American company Marvel Comics. Earth X was written by Jim Krueger with art by John Paul Leon. Based on Alex Ross' notes, the series features a dystopian version of the Marvel Universe.

The series was followed by two sequels, Universe X and Paradise X, and a prequel, Marvels X. The universe of Earth X is designated Earth-9997.

The Earth X incarnation of Spider-Man will make his cinematic debut in the 2023 feature film Spider-Man: Across the Spider-Verse, depicted as a member of Miguel O'Hara's Spider-Forces.

History
Earth X began in 1997 when Wizard magazine asked Alex Ross to create a possible dystopian future for Marvel. Ross designed a future where all ordinary humans had gained superpowers, and he examined how some of the most well-known Marvel characters (including Spider-Man, Captain America and the Incredible Hulk) would manage a world where their superhero powers had now become commonplace. The issue of Wizard that contained the Ross article sold out rapidly. Demand was so extensive that in 1999 (in affiliation with Marvel), they republished the article as the Earth X Sketchbook, which also sold out. Based on this indicator of fan interest, Marvel commissioned Ross to create a full series based on his notes.

Plot summary

Earth X
Earth X is one of a number of planets implanted with a gestating Celestial egg. About ten years after the end of the heroic age, Black Bolt releases the mutagenic Terrigen Mists into Earth's atmosphere, seeking to transform humanity into Inhumans so that his people would not suffer persecution.

He blinded Uatu the Watcher to prevent him from witnessing his actions, and Black Bolt and the Inhumans leave Earth. Unable to operate his observation equipment, Uatu transports X-51 (Machine Man)—who has long since given up super-heroics to imitate the life of his human creator—to the Moon to act as Earth's new Watcher. X-51 gets increasingly annoyed at Uatu's assurance of the heroes' defeat.

After killing Red Skull, Captain America quits the Avengers, considering himself unfit for the team. Shortly afterward, Reed Richards constructs a worldwide network of vibranium power centers to solve the looming energy crisis, but the experiment fails when one of Reed's scientists falls into the reactor, causing a worldwide explosive chain reaction. The scientist that fell into the reactor became encased within vibranium and discovered that she can manipulate the rare metal, becoming the Iron Maiden.

The Terrigen Mists begin mutating Earth's human population, though much of the world blames "Plague X" on Richards' failed experiment. Benny Beckley, the young son of Comet Man, gains the ability to control the actions of others and becomes known as Skull. Nearly all of the world's telepaths are killed by the backlash caused by Beckley's power manifestation. Meanwhile, Doctor Doom and Namor the Sub-Mariner fight the Fantastic Four. Doom is killed in an explosion along with Susan Richards. Namor kills Johnny Storm. Franklin Richards responds by cursing Namor, causing one side of his body to burst into flame upon contact with air, forcing Namor back into the ocean. A distraught Reed Richards dons Doom's armor and exiles himself to Castle Doom in Latveria.

Soon after, the Absorbing Man absorbs Ultron. The Vision defeats the Absorbing Man with a computer virus. Attempting to isolate the virus by turning to stone, the Absorbing Man is shattered by the Vision after murdering the Avengers. Absorbing Man's pieces are scattered amongst the world's leaders so that he can never be reassembled.

Norman Osborn manipulates America into electing him President by using alien DNA to create the Hydra—a parasite collective that mind-controls its host bodies—and grants Tony Stark (one of the last unmutated humans) political asylum in exchange for constructing robotic replicas of the fallen Avengers to battle the Hydra menace.

Loki tricked Odin into changing Thor into a female and discovers an elaborate Celestial manipulation on a cosmic scale: ancient humans were modified by the Celestials, given the ability to develop powers in order to act as a type of anti-bodies meant to stop radical elements such as deviants and alien species from harming the Earth and the Celestial embryo growing within it. Along with Earth, the Celestials modified the native species of many planets harboring Celestial embryos. Species affected by Celestial modification gradually undergo an evolution process where they develop powers either through natural means such as mutants, or unnatural means such as meta-humans like Spider-Man. Species with Celestial modifications in theory hold enough power to rival the celestials, but are inhibited by a clever psychological safeguard put in place by the Celestials. The safeguard relates to constructivist philosophy, that essentially states that people are shaped by their environment. The deities and devils within the Marvel universe are species that were modified by Celestials and unwittingly inhibit their own abilities due to the fact that they self-identify as a Marvel deity or devil. These evolved beings hold their sense of identity being reinforced by those that interact with them. Loki realizes that he was only the evil son of Odin and a Norse God because when he evolved beyond his mortal form his psyche became a tabula rasa. The first interaction that he had with another in that form were Nordic humans who thought that he was an evil god and thus he became one.

Meanwhile, Captain America and his partner Redwing learn that the Skull is gathering a mind-controlled army. After Redwing is overcome by the Skull's powers, Captain America retreats and recruits allies to fight the Skull.

Meanwhile, the Inhuman Royal Family return from space and contact Reed Richards, hoping to reunite with their people. While trying to find the lost Inhuman nation with Cerebro, Richards discovers Bolt's actions. The Skull's army reaches New York, overtaking it, and Captain America and his allies fall to the Skull's powers. While the Skull is distracted, Captain America kills the child dictator and liberates his followers.

Before the heroes can celebrate, the  Celestials arrive on Earth to germinate the embryo. As the Celestials prepare to attack New York, Loki arrives with a host of Asgardians found in the afterlife and announces he's not bad because he formed the Avengers. Tony Stark sacrifices himself while trying to hold off the arriving Celestials. Black Bolt is killed just after using his voice to travel across the universe and call for Galactus, who is revealed to be devouring worlds in order to destroy Celestial embryos growing within them. Galactus kills several Celestials and forces the others to flee. Afterwards, Galactus consumes Earth's Celestial embryo. Galactus prepares to leave, and Reed requests that he remove his helmet. Galactus reluctantly agrees, revealing that he is actually Franklin Richards. Franklin Richards previously convinced himself that he was Galactus, willingly sacrificing his own identity to turn into the destroyer of worlds after realizing that Galactus needed to exist in order to keep the Celestial population in check. This needed to be done after the Fantastic Four killed the original Galactus with the ultimate nullifier. Reed Richards also realizes this fact and makes the heartbreaking decision to not remind Franklin of who he originally was for the sake of the universe.

X-51 realizes the Watchers' true purpose is to watch over Celestial eggs because one of their numbers failed to stop the birth of Galactus millions of years ago. X-51 destroys Uatu's ears and decides to destroy all Celestial eggs gestating inside the various planets within the universe. Reed converts his vibranium power network into "Human Torches", hoping to burn off the Terrigen Mists and restore Earth's human population.

Universe X
With the Celestial embryo gone, the Earth's mass is reduced, causing a shift in orbit and polarity as well as drastic worldwide climate changes. One-fourth of New York's population dies as temperatures plummet. The Tong of Creel, a cult dedicated to reassembling the Absorbing Man, begins killing those who hold his fragments. Under Mephisto's influence, Pope Immortus founds a church advocating mutant dominance of the galaxy and the destruction of Reed's Human Torches. Meanwhile, Mar-Vell is reincarnated as the child of the synthetic Him and Her, though his soul remains in the Realm of the Dead. Captain America becomes the Mar-Vell child's guardian and embarks on a worldwide quest with his new ward to obtain various items in order to deal with Earth's restless mutant population and prepare for an impending war in the Realm of the Dead. Arriving at Zero Street, the duo is attacked by the Night People, and Captain America sacrifices his life to save the Mar-Vell child.

Mar-Vell reveals that other than creating constructivist safeguards to stop species that they modified from being able to challenge their supremacy, the Celestials also schemed to manipulate causality and fatalism by helping to create beings such as death and Mephisto to distort truth and reality. Mar-Vell also discovered that beings that travel through time actually create new universes in the process of doing so and Celestials, acting through others such as Mephisto, encouraged time travel as it created entirely new universes for the Celestial to inhabit and grow in number.

When the Tong of Creel finally reassembles the Absorbing Man in New York, he attacks the city's Human Torch. Battling New York's heroes, the Absorbing Man absorbs Manhattan itself, adding its buildings and streets to his being, but Loki and Iron Maiden convince the villain to transform himself into vibranium and use his mass to stabilize the planet's fluctuating orbit and polarity. Meanwhile, in the Realm of the Dead, Mar-Vell leads an army of deceased heroes and villains against Thanos and Death. With the artifacts collected by himself and Captain America in his possession, Mar-Vell shows Thanos how Death has manipulated him and convinces Thanos to use the Ultimate Nullifier on the entity.

Paradise X

With Death destroyed, Mar-Vell constructs a Paradise in the center of the Negative Zone for the dead to inhabit. However, those among the living find themselves unable to die.

Meanwhile, X-51 decides that the inhabitants of alternate Earths should be warned about the Celestial embryos he believes are growing within their planets. He spreads the alarm across the multiverse by recruiting and dispatching Heralds from alternate timelines such as Bloodstorm (Ororo Monroe, Earth-1298), Deathlok (Luther Manning, Earth-7484), Hyperion (Earth-1121), Killraven (Earth-691), Iron Man 2020 (Earth-8410), Spider-Girl (Earth-1122), and Wolverine (Days of Future Past Earth-811).

After banishing the Watchers of Earth-9997 to alternate worlds with the hope that their presence will lead to the discovery and destruction of each Celestial embryo, X-51 takes his Heralds to his Earth, where he will aid each in achieving his or her wishes. In Mar-Vell's Paradise, the High Evolutionary's equipment transforms the souls of Black Bolt, Captain America, Daredevil (Matt Murdock), Dr. Doom, Giant-Man, Phoenix, and Tony Stark into the Avenging Host, charged with ushering souls from the Realm of the Dead to Paradise. Those who enter Paradise consume a piece of the Cosmic Cube, enabling them to create their own, seemingly perfect pocket reality. But as more souls enter Paradise, it begins to expand and consume entire worlds within the Negative Zone, causing Blastaar and Annihilus to attack the Baxter Building in New York.

Reed Richards, Bruce Banner, the Beast, and several other brilliant scientists convene to discuss a solution to Death's absence. They decide to access the imprisoned Jude the Entropic Man, who can turn others to dust on contact, and synthesize his essence into a chemical to end the suffering of those unable to die. With the chemical complete, Reed, growing suspicious of Mar-Vell's motives, plans to use Pym Particles to slow Paradise's rapid growth within the Negative Zone. Mephisto frees Jude from captivity, convincing him to go on a killing spree. Mephisto then steers Jude to Britain, where Mephisto hopes to find the Siege Perilous, which will allow him to traverse the multiverse. With the help of Merlin, Doctor Strange, Psylocke and the sacrifice of a recently resurrected Meggan, King Britain is able to slay Mephisto with Excalibur. Meanwhile, in Paradise, Reed and a legion of heroes confront Mar-Vell. After Paradise is nearly conquered in the name of the Supreme Intelligence by the arriving souls of the Kree military, Mar-Vell explains to Reed that he (Reed) is to become the new Eternity.

Using his new role as Eternity, Reed is able to end the conflict and free the remaining heroes from their Cosmic Cube-induced dream-worlds. Once this is accomplished, Mar-Vell explains to Reed that his plan is to build a wall around their universe, preventing any further influence from the Celestials. Feeling that his work is not yet complete, Mar-Vell tells the people of Paradise that he is going to the source of Excalibur, which is strongly implied to be the original universe.

Marvels X
In 2020 Marvel published Marvels X, a prequel to Earth X written by Krueger. It focuses on the last normal human being on Earth named David as he deals with the aftermath of the terrigen mist that turns most of the individuals of Earth into super powered beings and freaks.

Characters (Earth X and Universe X)
 Uatu – Uatu has been blinded and hasn't been able to watch the Earth for twenty years, and has become very nihilistic and callous.
 Machine Man – A transparent Machine Man has become the New Watcher after Uatu became blind, and ultimately renders Uatu useless by removing his source of hearing, annoyed at his assurance at the heroes' defeat.

Avengers
 Steve Rogers/Captain America – Steve Rogers/Captain America is 100 years old and showing his age, although still in physically good shape. He has become a broken, haunted man who struggles to maintain hope in defending the nation whose name he bears. He bears an A-shaped scar on his forehead.
 T'Challa/Black Panther – T'Challa/Black Panther mutated and now is a Panther-Man.
 Bruce Banner/Hulk – Hulk has been separated from Bruce Banner, and Bruce is now a child while the Hulk has devolved into an ape-like creature. The Hulk serves as Bruce Banner's eyes as Bruce is now blind.
 Carol Danvers/Ms. Marvel – Ms. Marvel assisted Mar-Vell in fighting Death.
 Thor – Thor is now a woman due to Loki tricking Odin into thinking that Thor needs to learn humility as a female.

Avenging Host
After Mar-Vell killed Death, he reshapes part of the Realm of the Dead into a paradise and selected a group of dead heroes to be its guardians called the Avenging Host where most of its members have angel-like forms.

 Blackagar Boltagon/Black Bolt – After trying to stop Maximus from detonating the Terrigen Crystal Bomb, he died in battle against the Celestials. He sports an angel-like appearance with a skin pattern and wings that resemble his costume.
 Victor Von Doom/Doctor Doom – He dies in an explosion. Victor Von Doom/Doctor Doom adopts metallic skin and bird-like wings.
 Hank Pym/Giant-Man – Absorbing Man kills him by impaling him on the Washington Monument.
 Clint Barton/Hawkeye – Clint Barton/Hawkeye was mutated to have two additional sets of arms. Absorbing Man kills him by absorbing rubber and deflecting his arrows back at him.
 Tony Stark/Iron Man – Fearing mutation, Tony Stark isolates himself in a sterile environment, remotely controlling his Iron Man suits.
 Matt Murdock/Daredevil – He and Elektra Natchios are killed by Bullseye.
 Phoenix Force – In death, adopts a hybrid appearance of Jean Grey and the Phoenix Force.

Fantastic Four
The Fantastic Four no longer exist with the exception of Invisible Woman.

 Reed Richards/Mister Fantastic – Reed Richards/Mister Fantastic wears Doctor Doom's armor and inhabits his castle.  In Universe X, he donates an arm for Alicia Master to sculpt in the image of Susan Storm-Richards and the two are reunited. In Paradise X, he becomes the New Eternity.
 Susan Storm/Invisible Woman – Invisible Woman accepted her fate and ultimately learned to live in the dystopian society, in addition to never return to her home.
 Ben Grimm/Thing – Thing married Alicia Masters and they have two children, Buzz and Chuck (Brothers Grimm).
 Johnny Storm/Human Torch - The Human Torch was killed by Namor the Sub-Mariner by snapping his neck.

X-Men
 Charles Xavier/Professor X – Charles Xavier/Professor X died at the beginning of the mutations when the Skull's power manifestation caused a psychic backlash and the X-Men disbanded. His spirit later aided Mar-Vell in fighting Death.
 Warren Worthington/Archangel – Archangel lost his fortune and became a literal "guardian angel".
 Sean Cassidy/Banshee – Banshee was killed by Black Tom Cassidy. His spirit later aided Mar-Vell into fighting Death.
 Hank McCoy/Beast – Beast's fur became white and he moved to Wakanda to work under Black Panther.
 Nathan Summers/Cable – Cable fully succumbed to the techno-organic virus and took refuge in Sentinel City.
 Piotr "Peter" Rasputin/Colossus – Colossus became the Czar of Russia.
 Scott Summers/Cyclops – Cyclops, under a new identity called Mr. S, becomes the leader of a new team of X-Men to help Captain America.
 Alison Blaire/Dazzler – Dazzler was killed by Mephisto in retaliation for Mar-Vell killing Death.
 Alex Summers/Havok – Havok joined his father Corsair in space following Professor X's death.
 Robert "Bobby" Drake/Iceman – Iceman is trapped in his ice form and was forced to move to a colder climate. He built a city at the North Pole.
 Katherine "Kitty" Pryde/Shadowcat – Katherine "Kitty" Pryde/Shadowcat was killed when protecting Piotr "Peter" Rasputin/Colossus from a bullet that was meant for him at the time when he couldn't shift to his metal form.
 Kurt Wagner/Nightcrawler – Kurt Wagner/Nightcrawler is a shadow of his former self and has forgotten that identity. After some trickery by Mephisto, Nightcrawler becomes what he always resembled, a demon. After losing his arm, Nightcrawler becomes Belasco: Lord of Limbo (an alternate realm sometimes referred to as Purgatory).
 Jean Grey – A woman who appears to be Jean is now married to Wolverine and the Phoenix Force resides in the Realm of the Dead. It is unclear how Jean could be alive when the Skull's emergence apparently killed all other telepaths. Later in the Earth X series as she is leaving Wolverine, the woman states that she is in fact Madelyne Pryor.
 Longshot – Longshot went missing and not even X-51 can find him.
 Jamie Madrox, the Multiple Man – Multiple Man ended up with the Wendigo Curse when he ate one of his dupes due to a food shortage.
 Nate Grey – Nate was infected by the techno-organic virus and became Stryfe. He battled Cable and died trying to protect Madelyne Pryor.
 Lorna Dane/Polaris – Polaris leaves with Havok to join Corsair in space.
 Anna Marie/Rogue – According to X-51, Rogue was killed by a kiss that killed Gambit as well. However, Beast recounts that Rogue was so grief-stricken by Gambit's death that she sought a cure for her mutant ability through Sauron (who ended up taking her life as well as her powers). The details of either of these two accounts, or if they are related or not remains to be substantiated.
 Ororo Munroe/Storm – Ororo Munroe/Storm marries T'Challa/Black Panther and becomes the Queen of Wakanda.
 John Proudstar/Thunderbird – John Proudstar/Thunderbird is seen in the Realm of the Dead talking with Professor X.
 James "Logan" Howlett/Wolverine – Wolverine is married to the woman claiming to be Jean Grey. He is overweight and appears to be drunk despite his healing factor. With help from Machine Man, he discovers that he is a descendant of Moon-Boy's species.

New X-Men
This is the new incarnation of the X-Men that is led by Cyclops. They were former members of the second Daredevil's circus:

 Charmer – Charmer can create energy constructs in the shape of snakes. She has feelings for her new mentor, which remains unrequited.
 Dogface – Dogface is implied to be a mutated dog living in Wakanda. He was the Dog-Faced Boy before joining the X-Men.
 Double-Header – Double-Header is a two-headed human.
 Mermaid – Mermaid has mutated a fish tail giving her the appearance of a mermaid. She is able to "swim" in the air.
 Tower – Tower is a giant human.

Other heroes
 Brian Braddock/Captain Britain – Brian Braddock/Captain Britain is the king of Britain.
 Christopher Summers/Corsair – Christopher Summers/Corsair is joined by Alex Summers/Havok and Lorna Dane/Polaris in space.
 Daredevil II – Following the death of the original Daredevil, a man with a powerful healing factor (who Thing believes to be Wade Wilson/Deadpool) has taken his name and performs as a circus stunt-man, using his powers to overcome horrific injuries.
 Devil Dinosaur and Moon-Boy – Devil Dinosaur and Moon-Boy are both dead. Their corpses are found on the Blue Area of the Moon.
 Doc Samson – Doc Samson becomes a psychiatrist of the Skull. He is killed when the Skull uses his powers to make Doc Samson rip himself inside out.
 Stephen Strange/Doctor Strange – Doctor Strange is killed in his astral form by Clea, who then allies herself with Loki. His body is looked after by Wong. Mar-Vell later restores his astral form enabling Doctor Strange to return to life.
 Kevin Plunder/Ka-Zar – Ka-Zar mutates to have the head of a smilodon.
 Luke Cage – Luke Cage fights crime as a police officer.
 Mar-Vell – Mar-Vell is reborn as a child and goes on a crusade to gather various powerful artifacts in order to create a paradise. Captain America joins him on his quest.
Namor McKenzie/Namor the Sub-Mariner – Namor is cursed by Franklin Richards for killing Human Torch. One side of his body burns when in contact with air forcing him to remain in the ocean.
 Kyle Richmond/Nighthawk – Kyle Richmond/Nighthawk's eyes, given by a disguised Mephisto, allow him to see into the future. He dictates what he sees to his colleague Isaac Christians so that a record can be kept of what will become of history.
 Hobbes Brown/Prowler – Hobbes Brown/Prowler possesses a piece of Absorbing Man following his rampage in Washington DC.
 Rom – Rom is stranded in Limbo and is forced to fight Dire Wraiths constantly. He is referred to as "the greatest Spaceknight".
 The Micronauts  - referred to as the "ant-men"
 Shanna O'Hara/Shanna the She-Devil – Shanna O'Hara/Shanna the She-Devil mutates to resemble a humanoid leopard.
 Peter Parker/Spider-Man – Peter Parker is publicly revealed as Spider-Man and retires, figuring he is no longer needed in this world of powers. However, he leaps into action once again after his daughter had been turned into a slave of the Skull.
 May "Mayday" Parker/Spider-Girl – Spider-Girl has bonded with the Venom symbiote, though she remains fully in control.
 Shiro Yoshida/Sunfire – Sunfire now rules Japan as its emperor.

Villains
 Carl "Crusher" Creel/Absorbing Man – Carl "Crusher" Creel/Absorbing Man absorbs Ultron's intelligence and gains better knowledge of his abilities. He kills the Avengers until Vision infects him with a virus and shatters him. Absorbing Man is brought back by the Tong of Creel and attacks New York. He is convinced by Loki and Iron Maiden to turn his body into Vibranium to save New York.
 Bullseye – Bullseye is killed when Daredevil learns the Hand's body-swapping technique.
 Otto Octavius/Doctor Octopus – Doctor Octopus is seen in Spider-Man's illusion on Peter Parker of which he took control.
 Enforcers – The Enforcers act as the bodyguards to President Norman Osborn.
 Fancy Dan – Fancy Dan mutates and becomes invisible except for his mustache.
 Montana – Montana mutates and develops the ability to change his hands into lassos.
 Ox – Ox mutates, taking the form of a humanoid ox (somewhat similar to a minotaur).
 Norman Osborn/Green Goblin – Norman Osborn is the President. His face has mutated to resemble a goblin, but he wears a mask to look human. He is later killed by the Skull. After he is tossed from his office window, his foot catches on the flag which breaks his neck, thus killing him in a way similar to Gwen Stacy's death.
 High Evolutionary – High Evolutionary uses one of his devices to convert Franklin Richards into the new Galactus.
 Immortus – Immortus is the Pope of a church dedicated to himself.
 Billy Russo/Jigsaw – Jigsaw commits suicide and dwells in the Realm of the Dead.
 Wilson Fisk/Kingpin – Kingpin is dead and dwells in the Realm of the Dead.
 Loki – Loki has figured out that the Gods (of this Marvel Earth) are instead long-lived mutants who are mind-locked by the Celestials into believing that they are immortal, never-changing gods so that they won't evolve further as mutants and potentially threaten the Celestials (as was the case with Reed Richards' son Franklin, who is so powerful as a mutant that just by believing himself to be Galactus, gained the powers and abilities of Galactus).
 Erik Lehnsherr/Magneto – At the time when the Terrigen Mist is in the atmosphere, Magneto thinks he is getting a "mutant" brother through every mutation. Magneto manipulates the Sentinels into building a sanctuary called Sentinel City in the Savage Land. Due to the polar shift in the planet, he loses his power which was later gained by Toad. Toad humiliates Magneto until Iron Maiden with the help of Cable restores part of earth's polarity giving Magneto back his power.
 Calvin Zabo/Mister Hyde – Mister Hyde is in the Realm of the Dead as one of the mindless dead. The details of his death are unknown.
 Karl Lykos/Sauron – Hank McCoy/Beast claims that, grief-stricken after killing Gambit with a kiss, Anna Marie/Rogue turns to Sauron's draining abilities in an attempt to lose her powers, but ended up losing her life as well. Whether this is true is not confirmed.
 Skull – Son of Comet Man, Benjamin Buckley aka The Skull is the main antagonist of the series. An adolescent neo-Nazi, he uses his Terrigen Mist granted-telepathic powers to rule the world, taking advantage of the Mists' catastrophic effects. Captain America defeats him by snapping his neck.
 Spiders Man – An African-American homeless man who mutates to a reptilian form that resembles Spider-Man's costume. He uses energy webs that can trap people in an illusion.
 Ultron – His intelligence is absorbed by Carl "Crusher" Creel/Absorbing Man.
 Adrian Toomes/Vulture – Adrian Toomes/Vulture mutates into his namesake minus the wings. He is associated with the Enforcers.

Other characters
 Harry Osborn – Harry is seen in Spider-Man's illusion on Peter Parker of which he gained control.
 J. Jonah Jameson – J. Jonah Jameson loses his job and the Daily Bugle goes out of business when Spider-Man reveals his identity as Peter Parker. Jameson later mutates into a humanoid donkey.
 John Jameson – John becomes Man-Wolf. Regulates his Man-Wolf transformations with a special device created by Reed Richards that absorbs ambient sunlight, which retards the transformation into the Man-Wolf during the evening hours.
 Red Ronin - decommissioned by Norman Osborn, his blueprints were used to make Iron Man's very last armor.

Clarifications
Initially, the Earth X storyline was purported as being the future of Earth-616, but the series often substantially retconned the origins and workings of characters to better suit the story, to the point where they were no longer reconcilable with their counterparts in the mainstream Marvel Universe. One example is the revelation in Paradise X that Wolverine is not a mutant, but instead one of the few remaining "pure strain humans", free from the genetic manipulations of the Celestials (as well as a descendant of Moon-Boy). Marvel editors solved these discrepancies by officially declaring that anything stated in Earth X would not be considered canonical. It is later revealed in issue #11 of Paradise X that the events shown in the series are not set in an alternative future, but rather an alternative present (the issue reveals that Paradise X is set in 2003, the year of publication).

The Paradise X series was never properly concluded, due to editorial interference midway through its publication. Due to dwindling sales, the X and A specials, which were intended to be double-sized issues, were both reduced to 22 pages and the intended ending was never used. Writer Jim Krueger expressed dismay at the loss of pages and not being able to use the original ending. In the intended ending, Captain America, suspecting Captain Marvel's treachery, would have killed Marvel just as Marvel put the energy wall around the universe to keep out the Celestials and Elders. At this final moment, having ascended to the throne of Paradise, Captain America would have realized that Marvel's intentions were good: "Cap would have sat on the throne, completely unworthy of it. And this, this would have been the final testing necessary to make Cap worthy of it".

Additionally, a planned limited series, Tales of Earth X, was proposed but never greenlighted. The series, set before the events of Earth X, would have revealed the final days of characters like Professor X before the mutation that turned the world into mutants and killed all of Earth's psychics.

A one-shot called The Earth X Companion was released in 2008, containing production notes and sketches by Jim Krueger and Alex Ross as well as a short story drawn by artist Bill Reinhold detailing the fate of one of Nick Fury's Life Model Decoys.

Collected editions
In September 2005, Marvel released a 592-page hardcover deluxe edition of Earth X. This new edition includes 12 issues of the Earth X regular series, the #0 and #X bookends, the #1/2 issue (drawn by artist Bill Reinhold) and the Epilogue. It also contains extras pulled from the Graphitti hardcover, Marvel's trade paperback and the sketchbooks.

The various volumes include:

Earth X (hardcover, September 2005, softcover, January 2001, July 2006)
Universe X:
Volume 1 (softcover, February 2002, December 2006)
Volume 2 (softcover, June 2002, March 2007)
Paradise X:
Volume 1 (softcover, October 2003, August 2007)
Volume 2 (softcover, December, 2003, September 2007)

Accompanying volumes include:

Earth X Trilogy Companion (collects Earth X #1/2, background material and sketches, 200 pages, October 2007)

In other media
The Earth X incarnation of Spider-Man will make his cinematic debut in the 2023 feature film Spider-Man: Across the Spider-Verse, depicted as a member of Miguel O'Hara's Spider-Forces.

See also
 Multiverse (Marvel Comics)
 Inhumanity
 Kingdom Come, another alternate universe series, illustrated by Alex Ross for DC Comics which has similar themes and artwork to Earth X.

References

External links
 
 
 
 
 
 
 Read Earth X #1 online
 Infinite Ammo: Greatest Graphic Novels Review

Dystopian comics
Marvel Comics dimensions
X
Comics about parallel universes